June Stephenson  (born 30 January 1943) is an English former cricketer who played as a lower-order batter and right-arm medium bowler. She appeared in 12 Test matches and 9 One Day Internationals for England between 1966 and 1976. She played domestic cricket for Yorkshire.

References

External links
 
 

1943 births
Living people
Cricketers from Bradford
England women Test cricketers
England women One Day International cricketers
Yorkshire women cricketers